Collectivism may refer to:

 Bureaucratic collectivism, a theory of class society which is used to describe the Soviet Union under Joseph Stalin
 Collectivist anarchism, a socialist doctrine in which the workers own and manage the production
 Collectivism and individualism, types of social organization
 Collectivism (art), art which is created by a group of people rather than an individual
 Communitarianism, a political position that emphasizes the importance of the community over the individual or attempts to integrate the two.
 Corporatism, a political ideology in which groups, rather than individuals, are the building blocks of society
 Soviet collectivism, an approach to agriculture, property, and identity in the Soviet Union